was a Japanese communications engineer, executive advisor to the CEO of Sumitomo Electric. He was one of the main researchers contributing to the development of optical fiber technology.

He earned his B.E. in 1953 and his Ph.D. in 1961, both in electrical engineering, from the University of Tokyo. He did his post-doc at Polytechnic Institute of New York University. He was a foreign associate of the US National Academy of Engineering and a member of the Board of Trustees of Polytechnic Institute of New York University.

Nakahara was an IEEE Life Fellow and served in a number of positions. In 2002, he received the IEEE Alexander Graham Bell Medal.

Notes

External links
 Tsuneo Nakahara Oral History at IEEE History Center, dated May 20, 1994.

1930 births
2016 deaths
Japanese electrical engineers
University of Tokyo alumni
Fiber optics
Polytechnic Institute of New York University faculty
Foreign associates of the National Academy of Engineering
Fellow Members of the IEEE